The Jacksonville Jaguars joined the National Football League (NFL) in 1995 as an expansion team, along with the Carolina Panthers.  The club's first selection in the NFL draft as a team was Tony Boselli, an offensive tackle from the University of Southern California (USC).  The team's most recent first-round selection were quarterback Trevor Lawrence and running back Travis Etienne, both from Clemson University in 2021.

Every year during April, each NFL franchise seeks to add new players to its roster through a collegiate draft known as "the NFL Annual Player Selection Meeting", which is more commonly known as the NFL Draft. Teams are ranked in inverse order based on the previous season's record, with the worst record picking first, and the second worst picking second and so on. The two exceptions to this order are made for teams that appeared in the previous Super Bowl; the Super Bowl champion always picks 32nd, and the Super Bowl loser always picks 31st. Teams have the option of trading away their picks to other teams for different picks, players, cash, or a combination thereof. Thus, it is not uncommon for a team's actual draft pick to differ from their assigned draft pick, or for a team to have extra or no draft picks in any round due to these trades.

The Jaguars have selected the number one overall pick in the draft twice and have selected the second overall pick three times. The team has selected five players in the first round from the University of Florida, two each from the University of Southern California and the University of Tennessee.

Key

Player selections

Footnotes

References 

 
 
 
 
 

Jacksonville Jaguars

first-round draft picks